Biplob Bhattacharjee (born 7 January 1981), sometimes called Biplob Bhattacharya, is a Bangladeshi retired professional footballer, who is the current goalkeeping coach and former goalkeeper of Bangladesh National Football Team, also played as a goalkeeper for Sheikh Russel KC, Abahani, Mohammedan and other clubs. Since making his debut at the age of 18, he has won 24 caps for his country.

Club career
In 1997, Bhattacharjee joined Arambagh KS who played in the Dhaka League at the time. Three years later he became a full-time footballer when Arambagh were one of the founder members of the Bangladesh Professional Football League. He spent six years with the club before leaving at the end of the 2003 season. He signed for Brothers Union in time for the 2004 campaign but left the side after the season ended. Bhattachargee was signed by Mohammedan Sporting Club for the 2005–06 season but again moved on after one campaign. In 2007, he joined Abahani Limited, where he played as of 2011. In 2011, he joined Sheikh Russel KC.

International career
Bhattacharjee's performances for Arambagh in his first season led to him being called up to the Bangladesh national football team in early 1997 for their 1998 FIFA World Cup qualifying campaign. He made his international debut at the age of 18 in the 0–3 defeat to Saudi Arabia on 27 March 1997. In the following four days he made two more appearances for the team, keeping goal in the 2–1 win over Taiwan and the 0–1 loss to Malaysia.

It was another six years before Bhattacharjee was called up to the Bangladesh team again, when he was named in their squad for the 2003 South Asian Football Federation Gold Cup. He was included as a back-up to first choice goalkeeper Aminul Hoque although he did play in the 3–0 win against Bhutan on 15 January 2003. Bhattacharjee remained second choice behind Haque, playing one match in 2005 and two the following year. However, in 2007, he regained his place in the Bangladesh side and won six caps, playing in all of Bangladesh's matches that year. He has not played another game for the team since. He was included in the preliminary 30-man squad to participate in the 2009 South Asian Football Federation Cup, 2010 South Asian Games and the 2010 AFC Challenge Cup. However, when national coach Dido was dismissed from his post, Bhattacharjee was one of seven players excluded from the final squad.

Honours

Bangladesh
 SAFF Championship: 2003

References

External links
 

1981 births
Living people
Bangladeshi footballers
Bangladeshi Hindus
Bangladesh international footballers
Association football goalkeepers
Footballers at the 2002 Asian Games
Asian Games competitors for Bangladesh
Sheikh Russel KC players
Mohammedan SC (Dhaka) players
Abahani Limited (Dhaka) players
Arambagh KS players
Muktijoddha Sangsad KC players
Brothers Union players
People from Comilla